Ioichthys kashkini is a species of barreleye known only from the Arabian Sea where it has been recovered from a depth of .

Names
The scientific name is Ioichthys kashkini. Species in this family are commonly known as barreleyes or spookfishes.

Size
This species grows to a length of  SL.

Location
Ioichthys kashkini can be found in a marine environment and in a tropical climate. They are distributed in Western Indian Ocean and in the Arabian Sea.

References

External links

 
 
Arabian Sea
Fish described in 2004
Monotypic fish genera